Wulfhere (fl. AD 855-?877)  was Ealdorman for Wiltshire, when the Anglo-Saxon kingdoms, of England, were experiencing turbulent times. An invading Danish army had landed in East Anglia, in 865 and had conquered all of the English kingdoms apart from Wessex. The Danish king Guthrum was overrunning the kingdom of Wessex, with  Alfred the king of Wessex in retreat. The county of Wiltshire was part of Wessex and on its northern border was Danish held Mercia. Wulfhere was left with a problem, should he stay loyal to his king (Alfred) or do a deal with the invader? The evidence from the charters of the time infer that Wulfhere had some sort of arrangement with Guthrum. So when Alfred was able to regain control of his kingdom Wulfhere was held to account.

Background
In 865 the Great Danish Army landed in East Anglia with the intention of conquering  all the English kingdoms. During their campaign, the Viking army conquered the kingdoms of East Anglia, Mercia, and Northumbria and they overran the kingdom of Wessex. .

Ealdormen were responsible for ruling the shires on behalf of the king (Alfred the Great). Wulfhere was the Anglo Saxon ealdormen for Wiltshire.

Guthrum, the leader of the Danish army, from his base in Gloucester (Mercia) had been tracking the whereabouts of  Alfred and his army. He discovered where Alfred was spending Christmas of  878. Then shortly after Christmas, Guthrum carried out a surprise attack on Alfred's  royal vill, at Chippenham, Wiltshire. Alfred managed to escape into the marshes around Athelney. As Ealdorman for Wiltshire,  Wulfhere was responsible for the kings security, he had obviously failed in his duty, but why?

Treason and confiscation of lands
A charter from Alfred's successors reign, his son, Edward the Elder may give the answer. It says that

The fact that the two witans sat in judgement indicates the importance of the Wulfhere family.
The charter from Edward's reign is dated 901. The dates when Wulfhere had his land confiscated and was replaced, as Eolderman by Æthelholm, is not known, due to the absence of datable charters from the time.

Possible deal with Guthrum
Wulfhere is the only one of Alfred's Ealdormen to be named for desertion. However the Anglo-Saxon Chronicle for 878 says:

Alfred was retreating and Guthrum had overrun a large part of Wessex, the chronicle says that the greater part of the  population had to submit to him. The historian Barbara Yorke suggests that under these circumstances Wulfhere may well have had to negotiate with Guthrum. However, when Alfred reestablished control, after his victory at the Battle of Edington, Wulfhere's relationship with Guthrum may have been construed as treason.

A reflection of how important Wulhere and his family were, can be inferred by the fact that not all his lands were confiscated. Two pieces of land granted to Wulfhere, by Æthelred in 863,  were still in the family during the time of Wulfhere's grandson Wulfgar.

Notes

Citations

References

External links
 

9th-century English people
9th-century rulers in Europe
9th-century births
Year of birth unknown
Date of birth unknown
Date of death unknown
People from Wiltshire
Anglo-Saxon ealdormen